A historical museum is a museum which specialises in history.

Historical Museum may refer to:

Unqualified name
 Historical Museum, Frankfurt, Germany
 Historical Museum Bamberg, Germany
 Historical Museum of Aruba
 Historical Museum of Bosnia and Herzegovina, Sarajevo
 Historical Museum of Crete, Heraklion, Greece
 Historical Museum of the City of Gdańsk, Poland
 Historical Museum of Ioannina, Greece
 Historical Museum of Kraków, Poland
 National Museum of the Marine Corps, USA
 Historical Museum of the Mexican Revolution, Chihuahua, Mexico
 The Historical Museum of Northern Jutland, Denmark
 Historical Museum of the Palatinate, Speyer, Germany
 Historical Museum of the Saru River, Japan
 The Historical Museum of St. James – Assiniboia, Winnipeg, Canada
 Historical Museum of Serbia, Belgrade
 Historical Museum of Sughd, Tajikistan

Qualified name

Australia
 Castlemaine Art Museum, Victoria
 Dromana Historical Museum, Victoria
 Hastings Historical Society Museum, New South Wales
 James Cook Historical Museum, Queensland
 Lobethal Archives and Historical Museum, South Australia
 North Stradbroke Island Historical Museum, Queensland
 Queenscliffe Historical Museum, Victoria

Bulgaria
 Pleven Regional Historical Museum
 Plovdiv Regional Historical Museum
 Rousse Regional Historical Museum

Canada
 Broadview Historical Museum, Saskatchewan
 Jordan Historical Museum of the Twenty, Ontario
 Prince Albert Historical Museum, Saskatchewan
 Saint John Jewish Historical Museum, New Brunswick
 Thunder Bay Historical Museum, Ontario

Germany
 Deutsches Historisches Museum, Berlin
 Dresden Historical Museum
 Museum for Historical Maybach Vehicles, Bavaria

Japan
 Asuka Historical Museum
 Ebetsu City Historical Museum
 Eniwa City Historical Museum
 Esashi Town Historical Museum
 Kubote Historical Museum
 Kyushu Historical Museum
 Matsumae Town Historical Museum
 Matsura Historical Museum
 Mogami Yoshiaki Historical Museum
 Ōita City Historical Museum
 Satake Historical Museum
 Tottori City Historical Museum
 Uwajima City Historical Museum

Russia
 Military Historical Museum of Artillery, Engineers and Signal Corps, Saint Petersburg
 State Historical Museum, Moscow
 Volodymyr-Volynsky Historical Museum

United States
 Amberg Historical Museum Complex, Wisconsin
 American Swedish Historical Museum, Pennsylvania
 Archer Historical Society Museum, Florida
 Arlington Historical Museum, Virginia
 Atchison County Historical Museum, Kansas
 Atlantic City Historical Museum, New Jersey
 Bardstown Historical Museum, Kentucky
 Buffalo Fire Historical Museum, New York
 Campbell Historical Museum, California
 Cedar Key Historical Museum, Florida
 Chapman Historical Museum, New York
 Chisholm Trail Historical Museum, Oklahoma
 Clark County Historical Museum, Washington
 Clarke Historical Museum, California
 Clay County Historical Museum, Florida
 Clay County Historical Society Museum, Missouri
 Cloud County Historical Museum, Kansas
 Deschutes Historical Museum, Oregon
 Delaware County Historical Museum Complex, Iowa
 Detroit Historical Museum, Michigan
 DuPage County Historical Museum, Illinois
 Edmonds Historical Museum, Washington
 Flagler Beach Historical Museum, Florida
 Greensboro Historical Museum, North Carolina
 Halifax Historical Museum, Florida
 Hancock Historical Museum, Ohio
 Harrison County Historical Museum, Texas
 Harvey County Historical Museum, Kansas
 Hawthorne Historical Museum and Cultural Center, Florida
 Hoboken Historical Museum, New Jersey
 Indian Rocks Beach Historical Museum, Florida
 IXL Historical Museum, Michigan
 J. M. Davis Arms and Historical Museum, Oklahoma
 J. Millard Tawes Historical Museum, Maryland
 Jeffersontown Historical Museum, Kentucky
 Joliet Area Historical Museum, Illinois
 Kaleva Historical Museum, Michigan
 Kings Mountain Historical Museum, North Carolina
 Lady Lake Historical Society Museum, Florida
 Lake City-Columbia County Historical Museum, Florida
 Lake Worth Historical Museum, Florida
 Lamar County Historical Museum, Texas
 Lexington Historical Museum, Missouri
 Los Alamos Historical Museum, California
 Maitland Historical Museum, Florida
 Marathon County Historical Museum, Wisconsin
 Meigs County Historical Museum, Tennessee
 Mesa Historical Museum, Arizona
 Middleborough Historical Museum, Massachusetts
 Mitchell Depot Historical Museum, Georgia
 Marco Island Historical Museum, Florida
 Modoc County Historical Museum, California
 Monson Historical Society Museum, Maine
 Montrose County Historical Museum, Colorado
 Motley County Historical Museum, Texas
 Motown Historical Museum, Michigan
 North Brevard Historical Museum, Florida
 Panhandle–Plains Historical Museum, Texas
 Pantego Academy Historical Museum, North Carolina
 Peabody Historical Library Museum, Kansas
 Pine Grove Historical Museum, Michigan
 Plymouth County Historical Museum, Iowa
 Polk County Historical Museum (disambiguation)
 Portuguese Historical Museum, California
 Quilcene Historical Museum, Washington
 Rusk County Historical Society Museum, Wisconsin
 San Jose Historical Museum, California
 Sandy Ground Historical Museum. New York
 Santa Barbara Historical Museum, California
 Sheboygan County Historical Museum, Wisconsin
 Sitka Historical Museum, Alaska
 Souders Historical Museum, Kansas
 Southampton Historical Museum, New York
 Washington-Wilkes Historical Museum, Georgia
 West Franklin Historical Museum, Illinois
 Wichita-Sedgwick County Historical Museum, Kansas
 Winter Park Historical Museum, Florida
 Wisconsin Historical Museum
 Worcester Historical Museum, Massachusetts

Elsewhere
 Aalborg Historical Museum, Denmark
 Basel Historical Museum, Switzerland
 Bern Historical Museum, Switzerland
 Historical and Folklore Museum of Corinth, Greece
 Historical-ethnographic museum of Khinalug village, Azerbaijan
 Jewish Historical Museum (disambiguation)
 Kutaisi State Historical Museum, Georgia
 The Plains Vintage Railway & Historical Museum, New Zealand
 Tacna Historical Museum, Peru
 Tamsui Historical Museum, Taiwan
 Vatican Historical Museum, Vatican City
 Vendsyssel Historical Museum, Denmark

See also
 Historic house museum, a general concept
 National Historical Museum, a general concept and several named museums
 Natural History Museum, London